The New Zealand sole or common sole, Peltorhamphus novaezeelandiae, is a righteye flounder of the genus Peltorhamphus, found around New Zealand in shallow enclosed waters less than 100 m in depth.  Their length is from 25 to 45 cm.

References

 
 Tony Ayling & Geoffrey Cox, Collins Guide to the Sea Fishes of New Zealand,  (William Collins Publishers Ltd, Auckland, New Zealand 1982) 

Pleuronectidae
Endemic marine fish of New Zealand
Fish described in 1862
Taxa named by Albert Günther